Tya Jané La Shon Ramey (born December 15, 1997) is a Trinidadian activist, model and beauty pageant titleholder who won Miss Universe Trinidad and Tobago 2022 and represented her country at the Miss Universe 2022 pageant. She placed Top 16 semi-finalist, making her the first Trinidadian intop at Miss Universe after 16 years, when Kenisha Thom placed Top 10 at Miss Universe 2006. Previously, she was crowned Miss Trinidad and Tobago 2019 and represented Trinidad and Tobago at Miss World 2019. She entered the Top 40 final with the Miss World Caribbean award.

Early and personal life

Ramey was born at King's County Hospital in Brooklyn, New York City, United States. In 2015, she graduated from Bishop Anstey High School East in Trincity, Trinidad and Tobago. In 2016, she earned her certificate in social work from the University of the West Indies Open Campus, which is based in Kingston, Jamaica. From 2017 to 2019, she studied social work and social policy at the University of the West Indies – Saint Augustine Campus in St. Augustine, Trinidad and Tobago.

Pageantry

Miss Trinidad and Tobago 2019
On June 16, 2019, Ramey represented Five Rivers at Miss Trinidad and Tobago 2019 at the Naparima Bowl auditorium in San Fernando, Trinidad and Tobago and won her title.

Miss World 2019
On December 14, 2019, Ramey represented Trinidad and Tobago at Miss World 2019 and competed against 110 other candidates at ExCeL London in London, United Kingdom. She finished in the Top 40 and was crowned Miss World Caribbean 2019.

Miss Universe Trinidad and Tobago 2022
On September 11, 2022, Ramey represented Arouca at Miss Trinidad and Tobago 2022 and competed against 24 other candidates at the Queen's Hall in St. Ann's, Port of Spain, Trinidad and Tobago. She won the title and succeeded Yvonne Clarke.

Miss Universe 2022
Ramey represented Trinidad and Tobago at Miss Universe 2022 at New Orleans Morial Convention Center, New Orleans, Louisiana, U.S on January 13, 2022. In the end, she placed Top 16.

References

External links

1997 births
Living people
People from Port of Spain
Trinidad and Tobago people of British descent
Trinidad and Tobago beauty pageant winners
Miss Universe 2022 contestants